Kaizad Gustad (born 1968) is an Indian film director and author based in Mumbai, India. He is best known for his 1998 comedy Bombay Boys. In his career as an author, he has written three books, Of No Fixed Address published in 1998 by HarperCollins, The Road to Mandalay and 7 Storeys.

Early life
Gustad was born in Bombay (now Mumbai) into a wealthy Parsi family. He has an older brother and a younger sister. He grew up on a farm in the outskirts of Wadi, a town in the Kalaburagi district of Karnataka, where his father and grandfather owned cinema theaters and a stone quarrying business. He first attended the Cathedral and John Connon School in Bombay and then studied at St. Paul's School, Darjeeling. At the age of sixteen, he moved along with his family to Sydney, Australia. He later attended New York University's Tisch School of the Arts to study film.

At the age of 18, Gustad left home and started traveling to different parts of the world. He kept a diary on his travels and called it "Of No Fixed Address," in reference to the fact that he had no fixed address for three years. He used this diary as the basis for his book of short stories entitled Of No Fixed Address, which was published in 1998.

Filmography

Bombay Boys
At 28, Gustad wrote and directed his debut feature film Bombay Boys. It starred Naseeruddin Shah, Naveen Andrews and Tara Deshpande among others. It was a break out commercial and critical cult success, paving the way for independent cinema in India. It also travelled to several film festivals worldwide and premiered at the Toronto Film Festival in 1998, followed by the Vancouver and London Film Festivals. The film was nominated for best film at Verzaubert, Berlin.

Boom
Gustad's next film as writer and director was Boom, which had an ensemble cast like  Amitabh Bachchan, Zeenat Aman, Jackie Shroff, Gulshan Grover, with the debut of supermodels Padma Lakshmi, Madhu Sapre and Katrina Kaif. It was released worldwide.

Later films
Gustad's third film, Bombil and Beatrice, was a British arthouse film made in English, and his fourth and latest offering was Jackpot, a film set in a casino in Goa, starring Sunny Leone and Naseeruddin Shah. The premiere of Jackpot was held at PVR Cinemas in Juhu, Mumbai, and was attended by Shah Rukh Khan. It was released worldwide.

Incidents
In May 2010, Gustad was found guilty of negligence leading to the death of Nadia Khan, an assistant producer working on the set of his film Mumbai Central. Khan was struck by a train near Mumbai's Mahalaxmi station during shooting in May 2004.

Personal life
Gustad dated Miss World Diana Hayden in 1998, during the release of Bombay Boys. In January 2004, he married Alexandra Ritt, an American woman. He has two sons, Zahaan and Zakary.

References

External links
 
 
 Kaizad Gustad at Kinopoisk

Film directors from Mumbai
Parsi people from Mumbai
1968 births
Living people
St. Paul's School, Darjeeling alumni
Tisch School of the Arts alumni
20th-century Indian film directors